= Hindalgi =

- city
- Location in Karnataka, India
- Coordinates: 15.87°N 74.47°E
- Country: India
- State: Karnataka
- District: Belgavi

Population (2011)
  - Total: 12,864

Languages
  - Official: Kannada
- Time zone: UTC+5:30 (IST)

Hindalgi is a census town in Belgaum district in the Indian state of Karnataka. Very small place

== Demographics ==
As of 2011 India census, Hindalgi had a population of 12,864. Males constitute 54% of the population and females 46%. Hindalgi has an average literacy rate of 79%, higher than the national average of 59.5%: male literacy is 82%, and female literacy is 76%. In Hindalgi, 11% of the population is under 6 years of age.
